Penelope Brudenell, Countess of Cardigan (born Penelope Anne Cooke; 14 February 1770 – 2 February 1826), was the wife of Robert Brudenell, 6th Earl of Cardigan.

She was the daughter of George John Cooke and his wife, the former Penelope Bowyer, of Harefield Park, London. Their other daughter, Maria, married Maj.-Gen. Henry Charles Edward Vernon.

Penelope married Robert Brudenell, MP, on 8 March 1794 at St. George's, Hanover Square, London. He succeeded his childless uncle, James Brudenell, 5th Earl of Cardigan, in the earldom in 1811. Their children were:
Lady Harriet Georgiana Brudenell (died 1836), who married Richard William Penn Curzon-Howe, 1st Earl Howe, and had children
Lady Augusta Brudenell (died 1853), who married Major Henry Bingham Baring and had children
Lady Elizabeth Anne Brudenell (c.1796-1824), who married twice: first to the Hon. John Perceval, son of Charles George Perceval, 2nd Baron Arden, by whom she had children, and second to Reverend William John Brodrick, 7th Viscount Midleton, by whom she had no children 
Lt.-Gen. James Thomas Brudenell, 7th Earl of Cardigan (1797-1868)
Lady Charlotte Penelope Brudenell (c.1802-1879), who married Henry Sturt and had children
Lady Mary Brudenell (1806-1867), who married Henry Thomas Pelham, 3rd Earl of Chichester, and had children
Lady Anne Brudenell (1809-1877), who married Field Marshal George Bingham, 3rd Earl of Lucan, and had children

In 1818 the countess was a Lady of the Bedchamber to Charlotte of Mecklenburg-Strelitz, queen consort of King George III of the United Kingdom. Queen Charlotte died in the same year. The countess died at Gopsall, Nottinghamshire, aged 55.

References

1770 births
1826 deaths
Penelope
English countesses